Foreign currency bonds are bonds denominated in a currency that is foreign to the entity issuing the bonds.

List of foreign currency bonds 
 Eurodollar bond, a U.S. dollar-denominated bond issued by a non-U.S. entity outside the U.S
 Baklava bond, a bond denominated in Turkish Lira and issued by a domestic or foreign entity in the Turkish market
 Yankee bond, a US dollar-denominated bond issued by a non-US entity in the US market
 Kangaroo bond, an Australian dollar-denominated bond issued by a non-Australian entity in the Australian market
 Maple bond, a Canadian dollar-denominated bond issued by a non-Canadian entity in the Canadian market
 Masala bonds an Indian rupee denominated bond issued outside India.
 Samurai bond, a Japanese yen-denominated bond issued by a non-Japanese entity in the Japanese market
 Uridashi bond, a non-yen-denominated bond sold to Japanese retail investors.
 Shibosai Bond, a private placement bond in the Japanese market with distribution limited to institutions and banks.
 Shogun bond, a non-yen-denominated bond issued in Japan by a non-Japanese institution or government
 Bulldog bond, a pound sterling-denominated bond issued in London by a foreign institution or government.
 Matryoshka bond, a Russian rouble-denominated bond issued in the Russian Federation by non-Russian entities. The name derives from the famous Russian wooden dolls, Matrioshka, popular among foreign visitors to Russia
 Arirang bond, a Korean won-denominated bond issued by a non-Korean entity in the Korean market
 Kimchi bond, a non-Korean won-denominated bond issued by a non-Korean entity in the Korean market
 Formosa bond, a non-New Taiwan Dollar-denominated bond issued by a non-Taiwan entity in the Taiwan market
 Panda bond, a Chinese renminbi-denominated bond issued by a non-China entity in the People's Republic of China market.
 Dim sum bond, a Chinese renminbi-denominated bond issued by a Chinese entity in Hong Kong. Enables foreign investors forbidden from investing in Chinese corporate debt in mainland China to invest in and be exposed to Chinese currency in Hong Kong.
 Kungfu bond, an offshore U.S. dollar-denominated bond issued by Chinese financial institutions and corporations.
 Huaso bond, a Chilean peso-denominated bond issued by a non-Chilean entity in the Chilean market.
 Lion City bond foreign currency denominated bond issued by foreign company in Singapore
 Komodo bonds, rupiah-denominated global bonds issued in Indonesia.
 Dual currency bonds

References 

Currency